Bromus orcuttianus is a species of brome grass known by the common name Orcutt's brome.

Distribution
It is native to western North America from Washington to Baja California, where it grows in many types of habitat.

Description
It is a perennial grass which may reach 1.6 meters in height. The inflorescence is an open array of spikelets, the lower ones drooping or nodding. The spikelets are flattened and have short awns at the tips of the fruits.

External links
Jepson Manual Treatment
USDA Plants Profile
Photo gallery

orcuttianus
Bunchgrasses of North America
Grasses of Mexico
Grasses of the United States
Native grasses of California
Flora of Baja California
Flora of the Cascade Range
Flora of Nevada
Flora of the Sierra Nevada (United States)
Flora of the West Coast of the United States
Natural history of the California chaparral and woodlands
Natural history of the California Coast Ranges
Natural history of the Peninsular Ranges
Natural history of the Santa Monica Mountains
Natural history of the Transverse Ranges
Flora without expected TNC conservation status